Some Old Bullshit (aka Some Old B******t) is a compilation album by the rap rock trio Beastie Boys released in February 8, 1994. It compiles several of their early EPs, recorded in the early 1980s. These recordings present a sound radically different from that of the hip-hop sound generally associated with the band. Instead, these songs represent the band's part in the early New York hardcore scene. The album also features taped segments originally heard on Noise The Show, a popular hardcore radio show on WNYU in New York that played early recordings from Beastie Boys.  These segments feature the hyperbolic introductions of Noise The Shows host, Tim Sommer, an early supporter of the band.

Track listing

Song origins
 Tracks 1 and 10 were taped from Tim Sommer's Noise The Show radio program.
 Tracks 2–9 are from the Polly Wog Stew EP.
 Tracks 11–14 are from the Cooky Puss single.

References

1994 compilation albums
Capitol Records compilation albums
Beastie Boys compilation albums
Hardcore punk compilation albums